Skrappy's is a youth-run, youth-oriented performing arts and after-school center as well as an all ages music venue, performance space and community hub located in downtown Tucson, Arizona. Starting off as a place for house shows for youth and by youth, it is billed as a drug-free, positive environment that encourages expression and youth culture. Skrappy's specializes in live music, music and art classes, visual art, printing, photography, writing, publishing, activism, organizing, civic engagement and empowerment, and as an open drop in - providing food, clothing and other services.

History (1995-2005) 

Skrappy's has existed in some capacity since 1995, when it was founded by current proprietor, Kathy Wooldridge. In addition to hosting national bands (such as Botch, Fall Out Boy, Give Up the Ghost), a wide variety of local Tucson artists and small bands have played nearly nightly since its inception. As an alcohol-free haven, teens can listen to music and socialize. Over the years the service offerings have grown and expanded along with the networking. Besides the regular live shows featuring a mix of local and touring bands for which it is best known, Skrappy's offers job opportunities, drug counseling, classes and emergency clothing, blankets and shelter. Since 2002, Skrappy's has operated under the umbrella of Our Family Services (formally known as Our Town Family Center), a community service-based nonprofit social services providing agency. Skrappy's is nationally recognized as a model of positive youth development and civic engagement and offers a variety of programs from dance, film-making and art classes to health fairs and a host of volunteering opportunities.

More than a place for music - Skrappy's is a youth community; a safe, positive, drug and alcohol free environment where young people can freely express themselves through music, theatre, art, journalism, dance, and lifestyles. Skrappy's encourages youth to embrace who they are and helps them achieve their goals. Young people involved at Skrappy's learn valuable life and social skills. Whether they are helping run the center, playing in a band or participating in a class activity, they increase their self-esteem, refine leadership skills and strengthen their sense of community. Skrappy's is based on a "do-it-yourself" ethic, where young people have ownership of the program. It is a place to be heard, a place to grow, a place where young people give each other the support, acceptance, love and family structure that may be missing in their lives. Skrappy's was founded in the mid-1990s by a group of youth and adults dedicated to a dream of establishing a regular venue for underground or independent music in Tucson, Arizona. As a music venue, Skrappy's saw the rise of many Tucson native bands such as The Bled, Versus the Mirror, Blues, The American Black Lung, Line of Fire, The Mean Reds, Beyond the Citadel of Coup de Grace and many others.

Skrappy's involvement

Art Classes at Old Pueblo Children's Academy 

In January 2006, youth from Skrappy's began volunteering at Old Pueblo Children's Academy which is a kindergarten through eighth grade charter school. Originally, youth would go to the school once a week and work with two grades at a time, using art as a means to teach creative expression, conflict resolution, listening and communication skills. In August 2006, youth began volunteering there twice a week. It is an excellent opportunity for the youth to give back to some of the neediest sectors of the community. The students form trusting relationships with the volunteers and learn important life skills, while the volunteers gain valuable training in mentoring, communication, patience, being part of a community, as well as career training for those interested in education or social services.

Project Contact 

This is a program funded in part by the United States Department of Health and Human Services through the Arizona Family Planning Council that offers pregnancy testing, birth control, STI and HIV testing and emergency contraception. Three times a year, Project Contact puts on an event at Skrappy's offering free STI and HIV testing. The events educate youth on family planning, physical and emotional health, and connects them to further resources as well as giving them a chance to discuss openly and in a mature way issues that in other places are considered taboo.

Wrap It Up Jam 

Once a year in the month of December, Planned Parenthood and Skrappy's hosts the Wrap It Up Jam in recognition of World AIDS Day. Free STI and HIV testing are offered, along with emergency contraception. The event educates youth on personal health and tolerance. By opening dialogue, it helps to make youth more conscientious and responsible world citizens.

Project Safe Place 

Skrappy's is one of many sites in Pima County for Safe Place, the national runaway prevention and intervention program for those under 18 and in crisis.  During the month of November, Skrappy's hosts an event in honor of National Runaway Prevention Month. Although the event changes yearly (2007 was youth art, musical performances, and movie screenings), the focus is on bringing to light the issue of youth runaways and homelessness. The youth involved come together from a variety of organizations to promote awareness of a prevalent problem and the myriad causes that lead to it.

Volunteering with Community Service Youth 

As a volunteer at Skrappy's, there are many opportunities to assist with the daily activities of this downtown youth-run activity and performing arts center. To socialize and receive help with connecting with community services. Depending on the age and availability of youth, these could include assisting in the café, charging front door during shows, security, sound managing, stage managing, band booking, helping with civic or after-school activities, and mentoring other youth.

Skrappy's provides an excellent opportunity for kids on probation or who have community service to learn responsibility, life skills, and proper work ethic while at the same time exposing them to an alternative way to spend their time even after their service is over. Community service youth have the opportunity to volunteer in any of the aforementioned areas and can come out of it with the same life and career skills as other youth. These youth become connected to the Skrappy's community and in turn become connected to the larger community.

The youth at Skrappy's learn numerous life and job skills, leadership and social skills, how to research, communication skills, self-esteem, conflict resolution, educational opportunities, parenting skills, mentoring, volunteering in their communities, the arts, freedom of expression and passion through voice, friendship, youth and adult relationships, customer service, basic bookkeeping, inventory, responsibility, and employment. In the end they become proactive citizens involved in their community.

Closing of locations 

In 2002, on the brink of closure, Skrappy's was temporarily relocated about two miles south of its 201 E. Broadway Blvd. location, behind a bread factory in an industrial area of Tucson. In 2003, a public grant allowed the venue to continue its existence at its original location. In 2005, Skrappy's was nearly shut down when a fight broke out after a show due to the actions of a few FSU members, resulting in a man's death along with injuries to others. City officials were quick to come to the venue's rescue, and another grant allowed it to continue its existence. Since opening in 1995, Skrappy's has been in over five locations with Broadway being its longest place of headquarters.

Skrappy's (2006-) 
In 2006, more than 16,000 young people walked through Skrappy's doors seeking self-expression, community engagement and a safe, stimulating, drug and alcohol-free environment. About 4,800 of those received services from Our Family's outreach staff in the form of food, clothing or referrals to other resources in the community. In 2006, more than 29,000 at-risk children, youth, families, seniors and disabled adults used the services which include counseling, education, housing, mediation and help for people in crisis. Aside from hosting shows, Skrappy's involved teens in break dancing classes, film and theater projects, training in art, karate, literacy, GPS mapping, sewing and fashion design. Skrappy's in effect became an urban park and after-school program deserving of public support. Skrappy's continued to have its usual shows until winter of that year when they were given a 90-day eviction notice. Their stay extended until the summer of 2007 with their last show at 201 E. Broadway Blvd in August. They moved out in September to Big Brothers Big Sisters' basement down the street and continued to provide services, but stopped doing shows. Skrappy's had the opportunity to move back to the industrial area near the bread factory on 17th street as a permanent location, but because of the lack of parking spaces required by the city and an unwelcoming neighborhood for youth, Skrappy's had no choice but to stay at Big Brothers Big Sisters. As a music venue, Skrappy's is an important pillar of Tucson's music scene and from a youth perspective, much of the scene's development has been focused around Skrappy's.

In 2008, Skrappy's found what seemed to be a home at 91 E. Toole Avenue, but because the building was not up to code and as a result, Skrappy's was homeless again. But the team of Skrappy's still did projects outside of a building, meeting at the houses of team members, collaborating with the University of Arizona and city officials of Tucson.

As of January 2009, Skrappy's relocated to 191 E. Toole Avenue in downtown Tucson, Arizona where it is in the development of construction - hoping to begin classes early in the summer and begin booking for shows late summer/early fall 2009.

Skrappy's Tucson Youth Collective 

Skrappy's is now synonymous with Tucson Youth Collective (TYC), a board of youth making choices for the youth of Tucson. It is also a group of projects such as:

Staples and Stitches: Skrappy's all-ages venue's design school aimed at teaching basic sewing skills and D.I.Y. design to youth. With Staples and Stitches, there is an opportunity to learn the skills to enable them to make their own clothing, design and create themselves in every way possible and  feels that real fashion does not need to be dictated by Vogue magazine, seasons, trends, size, gender, sexual orientation, or ethnicity. Staples and Stitches was founded by Liz Albert in 2008 as a part of Skrappy's.

Skrap Yard Recordings: a recording studio used by Skrappy's to record bands, founded in 2007 by Michael Patton (not the well-known singer, Mike Patton) with Kathy Wooldridge.

Desert Distro: A D.I.Y. distribution center of records, CDs, clothing, movies and more. Desert Distro was founded by Chris Coco in 2008 as a part of Skrappy's Tucson Youth Collective.

There will be more classes and places of interest gathered for TYC throughout 2009 such as art karate, breakdancing, film classes and much more.

References

External links 
 
 Skrappy's myspace
 TYC: Skrap Yard Recordings
 TYC: Staples and Stitches
 TYC: Desert Distro
 Arizona Daily Star article about Skrappy's
https://web.archive.org/web/20130715012913/http://skrappys.net/

Music venues in Arizona
Organizations based in Tucson, Arizona
Buildings and structures in Tucson, Arizona
Music venues completed in 1995
1995 establishments in Arizona